Anbyŏn station is a railway station in Anbyŏn-ŭp, Anbyŏn County in Kangwŏn province, North Korea. It is located on the Kangwŏn Line, which connects Kowŏn to P'yŏnggang, and is the start of the Kŭmgangsan Ch'ŏngnyŏn Line, which runs to the Mount Kŭmgang Tourist Region and continues south across the DMZ to Chejin in South Korea, although the section between Kŭmgangsan and Chejin has been out of service since 2008.

History
The station, along with the rest of the former Kyŏngwŏn Line, was opened by the Chosen Government Railway (Sentetsu) on 16 August 1914. The first section of the former Tonghae Pukpu Line, from Anbyŏn to Hŭpkok (nowadays called Myŏnggo), was opened by Sentetsu on 1 September 1929. After the partition of Korea following the Pacific War, the section of the Tonghae Pukpu line from Anbyŏn to Kamho fell within North Korea, and was renamed Kŭmgangsan Ch'ŏngnyŏn Line.

References

Railway stations in North Korea
Buildings and structures in Kangwon Province
Railway stations opened in 1914
1914 establishments in Korea